This is a list of Kosovo national futsal team results from 2020 to 2029.

History

2020: Year to be forgotten
On 7 November 2019, in Nyon, it was decided that Kosovo should be part in Group F of the UEFA Futsal Euro 2022 qualifying, together with Austria, Georgia and Germany. On 29 January 2020, Kosovo started the qualifying cycle against Austria which they defeated with a score 4–2. One day later, Kosovo suffered the deepest defeat in its history being defeated by Germany 8–4. Two days later, Kosovo again suffers a loss from host Georgia and I end this campaign with a win and two losses making it the worst campaign Kosovo has ever had. Suddenly, on 17 March 2020, all Football Federation of Kosovo's activities were interrupted, including even futsal-related activities due to COVID-19, which led to postponement and then cancellation of gatherings and eventual matches that the national team would have in that year.

2021: Year of change
On 29 January 2021, the Football Federation of Kosovo announced that Arben Simitçiu is the new coach of the national team, replacing the former coach Ramadan Cimili whose contract had expired. On 19 March 2021, Simitçiu made his first squad announcement with national team for the friendly matches against the Netherlands.

Fixtures and results

2020

2021

2022

2023

Kosovo versus other countries
Head-to-head records are included only matches as FIFA member.

References

External links
 
Kosovo (futsal) News about the team

national futsal team results